Carabus avinovi is a species of ground beetle in the large genus Carabus.

References

avinovi